An Konishi (born 16 December 1980) is a Japanese table tennis player. She competed in the women's singles event at the 2000 Summer Olympics.

References

1980 births
Living people
Japanese female table tennis players
Olympic table tennis players of Japan
Table tennis players at the 2000 Summer Olympics
Place of birth missing (living people)
Asian Games medalists in table tennis
Medalists at the 2002 Asian Games
Asian Games bronze medalists for Japan
Table tennis players at the 2002 Asian Games